Joe Taylor is an American politician. He served as a Democratic member for the 7th district of the Indiana House of Representatives.

In 2017, Taylor was elected for the 7th district of the Indiana House of Representatives. He left office in 2018 to work for the United Auto Workers union.

References 

Living people
Place of birth missing (living people)
Year of birth missing (living people)
Democratic Party members of the Indiana House of Representatives
21st-century American politicians